Damak Multiple Campus (DMC) is a QAA Accredited affiliate Campus of Tribhuvan University (TU). It lies in Damak, Jhapa, Nepal supported and managed by the community. With affiliation from HSEB Damak multiple campus offers 10+2 program in Science, Management, Humanities and Education. It was established in 2038 BS. Initially only management subject was taught.

Department
 Department is a division of a university or school faculty devoted to a particular academic discipline.For the effective teaching service and supervision of the teachers towards their respective department, different departments had created.The following are the department in this college.
 Department of English
 Department of Nepali
 Department of Economics
 Department of Physics
 Department of Education
 Department of Mathematics

See also
 List of universities and colleges in Nepal
 Sukuna Multiple Campus
 List of schools in Nepal

References

External links

Universities and colleges in Nepal
Jhapa District